Alan Zweibel (born May 20, 1950) is an American television writer, author, playwright, and screenwriter whom The New York Times says has  “earned a place in the pantheon of American pop culture."   An original Saturday Night Live writer, Zweibel has won five Emmy Awards and two Writers Guild of America Awards for his work in television, which includes It's Garry Shandling's Show  (co-creator and producer) and Curb Your Enthusiasm.

Among his eclectic body of work, Zweibel collaborated with Billy Crystal on the Tony Award-winning production of 700 Sundays, and most recently co-wrote and produced the feature film, "Here Today" with Billy Crystal.

He has written 11 books — his latest, a cultural memoir Laugh Lines: My Life Helping Funny People Be Funnier  was published by Abrams Books in 2020. Other books include The Other Shulman: A Novel, which won the 2006 Thurber Prize for American Humor; and Lunatics with Dave Barry.

Early life
Zweibel was born May 20, 1950, in Brooklyn, New York City,  to  Julius and Shirley (Bram) Zweibel. He grew up in the New York City suburbs of Wantagh
and Woodmere on Long Island. He graduated from George W. Hewlett High School in 1968 and the University at Buffalo in 1972.

Upon graduation from college, Zweibel started writing for stand-up comedians who paid him seven dollars a joke. He later compiled over 1,100 jokes into a portfolio which he showed to producer Lorne Michaels who then hired Zweibel to be one of the original writers of a new show called Saturday Night Live.

Career

Television
During his five years at Saturday Night Live (1975–1980), Zweibel wrote many iconic sketches, including the Samurai for John Belushi, and created the characters of Roseanne Roseannadanna and Emily Litella, both portrayed by Gilda Radner. As an in-joke, Richard Feder of Fort Lee, New Jersey, a name and hometown often mentioned by Roseanne Roseannadanna on Weekend Update, is Zweibel's real life brother-in-law who did live in Fort Lee, New Jersey.

Zweibel's close friendship and collaboration with Gilda Radner extended beyond their tenure at Saturday Night Live – as her last television appearance was on an episode of It's Garry Shandling's Show which Zweibel co-created and produced. After Radner's death from ovarian cancer, Zweibel wrote a best-selling book about their relationship titled Bunny Bunny: Gilda Radner – a Sort of Love Story which he later adapted into an off-Broadway play, Bunny Bunny.

Zweibel has won multiple Emmy, Writers Guild of America (WGA), and Television Critics Awards (TCA) for his work in television which also includes Curb Your Enthusiasm, It's Garry Shandling's Show, and an episode of Monk.  He can be seen in the documentary The Last Laugh about humor and the Holocaust; Judd Apatow's The Zen Diaries of Garry Shandling (HBO); Gilbert, a documentary about the life of Gilbert Gottfried; and Love, Gilda, the Emmy-nominated CNN documentary for which he also served as executive producer.

Publishing
All told, Zweibel has written 11 books. His cultural memoir, Laugh Lines: My Life Helping Funny People Be Funnier  was published by Abrams Books in 2020. Other books include The Other Shulman: A Novel, which won the 2006 Thurber Prize for American Humor; Lunatics with Dave Barry; For This We Left Egypt and A Field Guide for the Jewish People, both with Dave Barry and Adam Mansbach; and Bunny Bunny: Gilda Radner—A Sort of Love Story.  His popular children's book, Our Tree Named Steve, was a Scholastic Book Club selection that has been translated into eleven languages, and his young adult novel, North, was made into a movie directed by Rob Reiner.  A collection of short stories and essays, Clothing Optional, was published by Villard in 2008. He also penned a best-selling e-book titled From My Bottom Drawer.

His humor has appeared in such diverse publications as Esquire, The Atlantic Monthly, The New York Times Op-Ed Page, The Huffington Post, and Mad Magazine.

Theater 
Zweibel's work has appeared both on and off Broadway. On Broadway, he co-wrote Fame Becomes Me with Martin Short, and collaborated with Billy Crystal on the Tony Award-winning production of 700 Sundays. Off-Broadway shows include Between Cars, Comic Dialogue, Bunny Bunny, and Happy.  Taking to the stage himself, Zweibel is an ensemble performer in Celebrity Autobiography at New York's Triad Theater— and is a sought after keynote speaker.

Film 
He co-wrote and co-produced Here Today (2021) with Billy Crystal (who also directed and starred alongside Tiffany Haddish), and was the co-writer for Dragnet (1987 film), The Story of Us (1999) and North (1994).

Accolades
Zweibel has been honored by the Writers Guild of America and the Television Critics Association. He was awarded the 2006 Thurber Prize for American Humor for his book, The Other Shulman. In 2009, he was awarded an honorary PhD. by the State University of New York, and in 2010, he was given the Ian McLellan Hunter Lifetime Achievement Award by the Writers Guild of America, East

Works

Books
North (1984)
Bunny Bunny: Gilda Radner – A Sort of Love Story (1994)
The Other Shulman: A Novel (2007)
Our Tree Named Steve (2007)
Clothing Optional: And Other Ways to Read These Stories (2008)
From the Bottom Drawer of: Alan Zweibel (2011)
Lunatics, with Dave Barry (2012)
Benjamin Franklin: Huge Pain In My , with Adam Mansbach (2017)
Benjamin Franklin: You've Got Mail, with Adam Mansbach (2017)
For this We Left Egypt? with Adam Mansbach and Dave Barry (2017)
A Field Guide to the Jewish People, with Adam Mansbach and Dave Barry (2019)
Laugh Lines: My Life Helping Funny People Be Funnier (2020)

Films
 Gilda Live (with Anne Beatts, Lorne Michaels, Michael O'Donoghue, Marilyn Suzanne Miller, Paul Shaffer, Don Novello and Rosie Shuster) (1980)
 Dragnet (with Dan Aykroyd and Tom Mankiewicz) (1987)
 North (with Andrew Scheinman) (1994) (also producer)
 The Story of Us (with Jessie Nelson) (1999) (also producer)
 Here Today (with Billy Crystal) (2021) (producer and co-writer with Billy Crystal)

Unproduced screenplays
Barbarians at the Plate
Bunny Bunny
Marrying Mom
Men Who Lunch
Once Upon a Time, Inc.
Teddy Young
Waiting for Sam to Die

Television
Saturday Night Live (1975–1980/1984/1987)
The Beach Boys: It's OK (1976)
The Paul Simon Special (1977)
Steve Martin's Best Show Ever (1981)
The New Show (1984)
It's Garry Shandling's Show (1986–1990) (also Co-Creator)
One of the Boys (1989) (also Creator/Executive Producer)
Saturday Night Live: 15th Anniversary (1989)
Good Sports (1991) (also Creator/Executive Producer)
The Please Watch the Jon Lovitz Special (1992) (also Executive Producer)
Great Performances: 25th Anniversary Special (with Cy Coleman) (1997)
I Am Your Child (with Rob Reiner) (1997)
Curb Your Enthusiasm (2001–2002) (Consulting Producer)
What Leonard Comes Home To (2002) (Executive Producer)
56th Primetime Emmy Awards (2003)
Monk (2007)
Late Show with David Letterman (2008–2009)
Women Without Men (2010)
700 Sundays (2014)

Broadway
Gilda Live (with Anne Beatts, Lorne Michaels, Michael O'Donoghue, Marilyn Suzanne Miller, Paul Shaffer, Don Novello and Rosie Shuster) (1979) Winter Garden Theater
700 Sundays (with Billy Crystal) (2005 Tony Award Winner) Broadhurst Theater
Martin Short: Fame Becomes Me, (with Martin Short) (2006) Bernard B. Jacobs Theater

Off Broadway
Diamonds (1984) (contributing writer) Circle in The Square
Between Cars (1985) Ensemble Studio Theater
Comic Dialogue (1986) Ensemble Studio Theater
Bunny, Bunny: Gilda Radner – A Sort of Romantic Comedy (1997) Lucille Lortel Theater
Happy, Summer Shorts Festival 4 (2010) 59E59 Theaters
Celebrity Autobiography — Triad Theater NYC (performer)

Appearances
Curb: The Discussion
Curb Your Enthusiasm (as "Duckstein")
E! True Hollywood Story: Gilda Radner
Good Morning America
The Late, Late Show
Late Night with Conan O'Brien
Late Show with David Letterman
Law and Order
Make 'em Laugh: The Funny Business of America
Making Trouble (documentary by Joan Micklin Silver)
North (as "Coach")
Politically Incorrect
Saturday Night Live
The Story of Us (as "Uncle Shelly")
The Today Show

Stage appearances
A History of Me (2007) U.S. Comedy Arts Festival
Celebrity Autobiography (2010) Triad Theatre, NYC; Broad Stage, LA

Awards
 (2010) WGAE Ian McLellan Hunter Award for Lifetime Achievement in Writing
 (2006) Thurber Prize for American Humor winner
 (2005) Tony Award for Best Special Theatrical Event 700 Sundays
 (1989) CableACE Award for Best Writing in a Comedy Series in "It's Garry Shandling's Show".
 (1977/78) Emmy for Outstanding Writing Achievement in a Comedy, Variety, or Music Series in "The Paul Simon Special".
 (1977/78) Emmy for Outstanding Writing Achievement in a Comedy, Variety, or Music Series in "NBC's Saturday Night".
 (1976/77) Emmy for Outstanding Writing Achievement in a Comedy, Variety, or Music Series in "NBC's Saturday Night".
 (1975/76) Emmy for Outstanding Writing Achievement in a Comedy, Variety, or Music Series in "NBC's Saturday Night".

References

External links

 
 

American comedy writers
Film producers from New York (state)
American memoirists
Television personalities from New York City
Television producers from New York City
American television writers
1950 births
Living people
Emmy Award winners
Writers Guild of America Award winners
Jewish American novelists
Jewish American comedy writers
Jewish American dramatists and playwrights
Jewish humorists
American male dramatists and playwrights
American male essayists
American male film actors
American male novelists
American male screenwriters
American male short story writers
American male television actors
George W. Hewlett High School alumni
University at Buffalo alumni
People from Millburn, New Jersey
People from Wantagh, New York
People from Woodmere, New York
Comedians from New Jersey
Comedians from New York City
Writers from Brooklyn
20th-century American male writers
21st-century American male writers
20th-century American male actors
21st-century American male actors
20th-century American comedians
21st-century American comedians
20th-century American dramatists and playwrights
21st-century American dramatists and playwrights
20th-century American essayists
21st-century American essayists
20th-century American novelists
21st-century American novelists
20th-century American short story writers
21st-century American short story writers
Novelists from New York (state)
Film directors from New Jersey
Film directors from New York (state)
Screenwriters from New York (state)
Screenwriters from New Jersey
Film producers from New Jersey
American male television writers
21st-century American Jews
Television producers from New Jersey